Theodorus was a Roman usurper against Emperor Valens according to Ammianus Marcellinus. Marcellinus was residing in Antioch in 372 and, making it clear that he is speaking as an eyewitness, tells us that Theodorus was thought to have been identified by divination as a new Emperor, the successor to Valens. He proceeds and explain how Theodorus and several others were made to confess their deceit through the use of torture and were cruelly punished after that. Nothing else is known about him.

References

Bibliography 
 Kelly, Gavin. Ammianus Marcellinus: The Allusive Historian.  Cambridge University Press, 2008, .

4th-century Roman usurpers
Year of birth unknown
Year of death unknown